Try Tag Rugby is the official Great Britain delegate to the International and European Tag Rugby Federations.

Great Britain Tag Rugby compete annually in the British & Irish Cup whilst focusing on development for the World Cup which takes place every three years. The Great Britain management team, head coaches, assistant coaches and support teams work with elite players ensuring we are best placed to perform and win at the very highest level. Squads include Men's, Women's and Mixed categories, requiring vision, dedication and execution from everyone involved.

The Great Britain vision currently resides on the World Cup 2021 in Ireland. Returning from the Tag World Cup in Australia at the end of 2018 with Bronze & Silver Medals has injected a huge enthusiasm to represent at the highest level which has resulted in the introduction of a National Development Squad, ensuring a pool of elite players presents breadth and depth across the board.

History

2012 Tag World Cup

The Great Britain & Ireland Tag Rugby squad was formed to represent the two nations in the 2012 Tag Football World Cup in Auckland, New Zealand on 5 December 2012. 
In the 2012 Tag World Cup the Great Britain and Ireland Mixed Open team had a very tight loss to the eventual world champions, New Zealand.

2015 Tag World Cup 

The 2015 Tag World Cup took place in December 2015 on the Sunshine Coast in Australia.

Great Britain took two teams out to the 2015 World Cup, ensuring the depth and talent of the squad was at its peak. This was the second time that the British competed at the Tag World Cup.

2018 Tag World Cup 

The 2018 Tag World Cup took place in Coffs Harbour, Australia, in November 2018.

More than 190 teams travelled to Coffs Harbour from around the world and Australia, bringing over 3800 players with officials and over 5000 families and supporters to the region.

Great Britain travelled with four squads and enjoyed their most successful campaign to date, with two medals.

Women's Seniors won bronze with a win in their 3/4 play-off, while the Men's 30s came away with a silver in their division. The Men's Open won their plate final

Great Britain national rugby league team